Joseph Heath Shuler (born December 31, 1971) is an American businessman, former NFL quarterback, and former U.S. Representative for  from 2007 to 2013. He is a member of the Democratic Party and was a member of the Blue Dog Coalition during his tenure. In the 2006 House elections, Shuler defeated incumbent Charles H. Taylor, but retired after his district was redrawn. During his tenure in Congress, Shuler was known for challenging the leadership of his party, and in 2010 ran against Nancy Pelosi for Minority Leader.

Shuler's congressional district covered the Blue Ridge Mountains in western North Carolina. The largest city in the district was Asheville, which has voted strongly Democratic, in part influenced by retirees from Northeastern and Midwestern areas. In redistricting, the Republican-dominated legislature redrew the boundaries of the 10th and 11th congressional districts, removing half of Asheville and making the district far more Republican in terms of voter history. As a result, Shuler announced his retirement from the House on February 2, 2012.

Early years
Shuler was born in Bryson City, North Carolina, a small town in the Great Smoky Mountains near the Tennessee border. His father was a mail carrier and his mother a homemaker and volunteer with the Swain County Youth Association; he has a younger brother, Benjie.

Shuler's athletic career began at Swain County High School in Bryson City. A standout quarterback who led his team to three state championships, he was named as the North Carolina High School Player of the Year. He attracted scout attention and accepted an athletic scholarship to the University of Tennessee in 1990.

College career
Under head coaches Johnny Majors and Phillip Fulmer, Shuler gained national attention as one of the SEC's top quarterbacks. After a limited role in the 1991 season behind quarterback Andy Kelly, he became a prolific passer. In the 1992 season, he passed for 1,712 passing yards, ten touchdowns, and four interceptions as Tennessee finished with a 9–3 record. The next season, he finished with 2,354 passing yards, 25 touchdowns, and eight interceptions as Tennessee finished with a 9–2–1 record. He held nearly all Volunteer passing records by the end of his collegiate career; most were subsequently eclipsed by Peyton Manning. In 1993, Shuler came in second behind Charlie Ward in the vote for the Heisman Trophy.

Collegiate statistics

Professional football career

Shuler was a first-round selection in the 1994 NFL Draft, taken by the Washington Redskins with the third overall pick. He held out of training camp until he received a 7-year, $19.25 million contract, most of the holdout being due to Shuler's agent and the Redskins general manager discussing the parameters of the contract. The Redskins had fallen on hard times since winning Super Bowl XXVI, and Shuler was considered the quarterback of the future. However, Shuler's poor play contributed to a quarterback controversy with fellow 1994 draft pick, seventh-rounder Gus Frerotte. Public and fan sentiment soon began to back Frerotte, especially after Shuler threw five interceptions in a 19–16 loss to the Arizona Cardinals. Shuler started 18 games in his first two years with the team and was benched in his third year, as Frerotte led the team.

After the 1996 season, Shuler was traded to the New Orleans Saints for a fifth-round pick in the 1997 draft and a third-round pick in 1998. Shuler's statistics remained poor. He suffered a serious foot injury during the 1997 season in New Orleans and had two surgeries to try to correct it. Football statistics site Football Outsiders called Shuler "The least valuable quarterback of 1997." Shuler chose the Saints over the Packers, who were also interested, because of the opportunity to start in New Orleans despite Washington GM Charley Casserly urging Shuler to pick the Packers because of their ability to develop quarterbacks.

After being unable to take the field due to his foot injury in his second season in New Orleans, Shuler signed with the Oakland Raiders. After re-injuring his foot in training camp, he was cut and later retired. As a professional, his career passer rating was a 54.3. In 2004, ESPN rated him the 17th biggest 'sports flop' of the past 25 years, along with the fourth biggest NFL Draft bust. In 2007, the NFL Network ranked Shuler as the ninth-biggest bust in NFL history.

Real estate career
After retiring from the NFL, Shuler returned to the University of Tennessee and completed his degree in psychology. He became a real estate professional in Knoxville, Tennessee. His real estate company was one of the largest independent firms in East Tennessee. In 2003, Shuler moved to Biltmore Forest, North Carolina.

U.S. House of Representatives

Elections
2006

In July 2005, Shuler announced his intention to seek the Democratic nomination to run against eight-term incumbent Republican Charles H. Taylor. North Carolina's 11th congressional district covered most of the Western North Carolina mountains where Shuler grew up.

Shuler was a tough target for opponents. His views on social issues were in line with the traditionally conservative district and he did not have a legislative record for opponents to attack. His campaign points were based on supporting cultural "mountain values:" opposing abortion rights, same-sex marriage and gun control. Taylor, an Appropriations subcommittee chairman, campaigned on his ability to bring federal money to the district. In October, with polls showing Taylor trailing, The Wall Street Journal ran a story about spending earmarks sought by Taylor that benefited many of his business interests. Taylor poured $2.5 million of his own money into his race, and spent $4.4 million overall, compared with Shuler's $1.8 million.

Shuler repeatedly attacked Taylor for failing to stand up for the 11th's interests. For example, he blasted Taylor for missing a vote on the Central American Free Trade Agreement, which passed by only two votes. Shuler pointed out that, according to the House roll call, Taylor voted 11 times on the same day that CAFTA came up for a vote, suggesting he deliberately avoided the vote. Taylor was one of two Republicans who did not vote on the bill, even though he had publicly opposed it in the past.

Taylor attempted to tie Shuler to House Democratic leader Nancy Pelosi, although Shuler was nearly as conservative on social issues as Taylor.

In the November election, Shuler won with 54 percent of the vote to Taylor's 46 percent. He carried nine of the district's 15 counties, including several that had reliably supported Taylor over the years. He even won Taylor's home county of Transylvania. Shuler was one of only two Democrats to defeat an incumbent in the South that year. His victory gave the Democrats a majority of the state's congressional delegation for the first time since the 1994 elections. North Carolina's 11th was one of thirty seats picked up by Democrats nationwide in 2006, giving them control of the House for the first time since 1994.

In 2009, a documentary film about the successful 2006 Democratic campaign to retake control of the House, HouseQuake, prominently featured then-Congressman Rahm Emanuel's efforts to recruit new candidates including Shuler. "Mr. Emanuel's efforts to get him to run offer one of the most revealing moments in the film," including two weeks of frequent phone calls about the balancing of family and Congressional obligations. The film was directed and produced by Karen Elizabeth Price, daughter of Congressman David Price who represents North Carolina's 4th congressional district.

2008

In 2008, Shuler faced Carl Mumpower, a Republican Asheville city councilman, and Libertarian Keith Smith.  Shuler won strongly with 62 percent of the vote.  He easily carried all 15 counties in the district, including the traditionally Republican Henderson County.

2010

In early 2009, Shuler was mentioned as a possible candidate to run against incumbent Republican Richard Burr for the United States Senate in the next year's elections. He ultimately chose not to do so, and sought reelection to the House. Shuler defeated Republican nominee Jeff Miller, winning reelection by a margin of 54% to 46%.

2012

Although Shuler represented a district with a slight Republican bent, he had a lifetime ACU rating of 28.5.

In July 2011, the Republican-dominated General Assembly significantly redrew the 11th. The district and its predecessors had been anchored in Asheville for over a century. However, the new map saw most of heavily Democratic Asheville drawn into the 10th.  To make up for the population loss, a number of heavily Republican counties in the Foothills were moved to the 11th. The redistricting reduced the percentage of registered Democrats in the 11th from 43% to 36%. Chris Cooper, a political science professor at Western Carolina University, concluded that the new district was so heavily Republican that Shuler would need to "practically completely separate himself from the Democratic party" in order to have any chance of winning a fourth term. Years later, NBC News also concluded that the redrawn 11th was all but unwinnable for a Democrat, even one as conservative as Shuler. The map was drawn in a way that a number of neighborhoods in Asheville, and even streets, were split between the two districts. In some parts of Asheville, one side of the street moved to the 10th while the other side remained in the 11th.

Over the course of 2011, several persons declared their candidacy for Shuler's seat or expressed interest in a possible run.

On February 2, 2012, Shuler announced that he would not run for another term. He endorsed his former chief of staff, Hayden Rogers, in the race to succeed him. However, as expected in the now heavily Republican district, Rogers was heavily defeated by Republican Mark Meadows. Years later, he told NBC News that the kind of ultra-precise redistricting that enabled the Republican-dominated legislature to split Asheville between two districts was bad for the country because it made it all but impossible to elect moderates to Congress. He argued that a fairer redistricting system was "the single greatest thing that could happen."

Tenure
Ideology
Shuler was a leader of the Blue Dog Coalition, a caucus of moderate-to-conservative House Democrats, initially serving as whip, and eventually rising to the role as co-chairman.

A list of bills sponsored by Shuler in the 112th Congress includes H.R.3065, the Target Practice and Marksmanship Training Support Act; H.R.2086, the Medical Debt Responsibility Act of 2011; H.R.2000, the SAVE Act of 2011: H.R. 1889, the Gas Tax Holiday Act; and H.R.1434, the International Child Protection Act of 2011.

In 2011, Shuler led a group of House Democrats in pressuring the President to deal with the AT&T and T-Mobile merger. The group pushed for the lawsuit to be settled by the Department of Justice. The group sided with the claim made by AT&T that the merger would create much-needed jobs.

In November 2011, Shuler took the lead in a bipartisan call calling for larger cuts of the U.S. deficit.

In 2007, Shuler introduced proposed legislation co-sponsored with fellow North Carolina U.S. Congressman Walter Jones to require airlines to have sections of the aircraft where large movie screens would not be visible.

Representative Shuler has also been a major supporter of the government of Sri Lanka in Congress.

Reportedly owing to his success in real estate, Shuler was named chairman of the House Small Business Subcommittee on Rural and Urban Entrepreneurship during the 110th and 111th Congresses. He has also been a deputy-at-large Whip.

Key votes during economic recession
Shuler voted against the Emergency Economic Stabilization Act of 2008 both times it came before the House. He later joined seven other conservative House Democrats in voting against the American Recovery and Reinvestment Act of 2009, an $819 billion economic stimulus bill proposed by President Barack Obama. Shuler also voted against the Affordable Health Care for America Act, or HR 3962, along with 38 other Democrats, despite voting yes on the Stupak amendment in the same bill, which prohibits federal funds to be used for abortions.
In January 2011, Shuler voted against repealing the law, explaining that the repeal would be immoral.

Cap and trade
Shuler voted in favor of HR 2454, the American Clean Energy and Security Act which would implement a cap and trade system aimed at controlling pollution.

Abortion
In 2011, he co-sponsored HR 3, the No Taxpayer Funding for Abortion Act, The bill contained an exception for "forcible rape," which opponents criticized as potentially excluding drug-facilitated rape, date rape, and other forms of rape. The bill also allowed an exception for minors who are victims of incest.

Guns
Shuler is a strong advocate of gun rights.  On January 10, 2011, the Washington Post reported that "[i]n the wake of the shooting of Rep. Gabrielle Giffords," Shuler "intends to arm himself more frequently" and is "encouraging his staff members to apply for carry permits." On January 29, 2011, a Doonesbury cartoon made fun of Shuler's plan to carry a gun.

LGBT issues
In April 2009, Shuler voted against the Matthew Shepard and James Byrd Jr. Hate Crimes Prevention Act.

Republican 2011 budget
In July 2011, Shuler was one of five Democrats to vote for the Cut, Cap, and Balance Act.

Interest in leadership position
During his 2010 campaign, Shuler showed interest in taking the place of Nancy Pelosi as Speaker of the House, if Democrats maintained their majority. On November 4, after Republicans had won a majority of seats in the upcoming Congress, Shuler predicted Pelosi would no longer be a leader in the House. However, if Pelosi wanted to take the minority leader position, Shuler told Roll Call, he would run against her if there were no "viable candidate".

On November 13, 2010, in a long New York Times article about Shuler, Campbell Robertson noted his use of a football analogy to describe the current situation of Congressional Democrats: "It's no different than me as a quarterback," he said. "I didn't play very good. So what they'd do? They benched me." Robertson noted that "Shuler has emerged as one of most prominent voices in the debate on the Democratic Party's immediate future. He was among the first to call for Ms. Pelosi to step down from her leadership role in the new Congress and said he would run for minority leader himself if no alternative emerged (though he admitted that he would be an underdog)."  According to Robertson, Shuler felt the Democratic leadership "has been too reflexively partisan" and called for "a more moderate approach."

Robertson observed that North Carolina "has long nurtured a strand of progressivism, particularly on issues like education, and a Sunday school brand of social conservatism — sometimes in the same candidate," and that "North Carolina's curious politics are on full display in Mr. Shuler's district, which ... includes the heavily Democratic city of Asheville, home to yoga studios and holistic medicine centers, as well as staunchly conservative hamlets scattered throughout the Blue Ridge Mountains."

As expected, Pelosi did run for minority leader, and on November 14, Shuler told CNN he would run against her, though he doubted he would win. Shuler lost to Pelosi 150-43 on November 17, but he was pleased that conservative Democrats showed they must be dealt with. On the opening day of the 112th Congress, Shuler received 11 votes for Speaker of the House, which his political aide called "the most dissenting votes recorded in modern history for partisan defections during a vote for Speaker"  (Since 1925).

Committee assignments
Committee on the Budget
Committee on Transportation and Infrastructure
Subcommittee on Economic Development, Public Buildings and Emergency Management
Subcommittee on Highways and Transit

Post-political career
Shuler transitioned to a lobbying position with Duke Energy to direct its lobbying and government affairs in Washington, D.C., in 2013.

In March 2020, he endorsed Joe Biden’s presidential bid.

Personal life
Shuler is married to Nikol Davis, with whom he has two children: a daughter, Island, and a son, Navy. Shuler remains active in the Fellowship of Christian Athletes. Shuler also serves as a volunteer assistant football coach for Christ School, a boarding and day school located in suburban Asheville. His son Navy attended Christ School and Appalachian State University before transferring to the University of Tennessee as a preferred walk-on quarterback.

In Washington, Shuler lived at the C Street House of The Fellowship, a controversial organization which operates the property as a tax-exempt church and a residence for several congressmen and senators. The building became notorious during a series of political sex scandals in 2009, in which current or former residents John Ensign, Mark Sanford, and Chip Pickering admitted to adulterous affairs, which their housemates knew of but did not publicize. In September 2010, The New Yorker published a piece about the house, focusing on the connection with a secretive religious organization called the Fellowship. Shuler has attended weekly prayer sessions sponsored by the group since his arrival in Washington. In reference to the secrecy, Shuler said "I've been here the whole time, and there's talk about what the Fellowship is, but I honestly have no idea what they're talking about. I honestly don't know what it is."

Electoral history
2006 Race for U.S. House of Representatives — North Carolina 11th District
Heath Shuler (D), 54%
Charles H. Taylor (R) (inc.), 46%

2008 Race for U.S. House of Representatives - North Carolina 11th District
Heath Shuler (D) (inc.), 62%
Carl Mumpower (R), 36%
Keith Smith (LIB), 2%

2010 Race for U.S. House of Representatives - North Carolina 11th District
Heath Shuler (D) (inc.), 54%
Jeff Miller (R), 46%

See also
North Carolina Democratic Party
Hayden Rogers

References

External links

Congressman Heath Shuler official U.S. House website
Heath Shuler for Congress  official campaign website
 
Profile at the Raleigh News & Observer
Profile at SourceWatch
 Heath Shuler's Blog.]
HouseQuake film synopsis.
Career stats for Shuler
NFL.com career stats

|-

|-

1971 births
21st-century American politicians
American athlete-politicians
American football quarterbacks
American lobbyists
American people of German descent
Democratic Party members of the United States House of Representatives from North Carolina
Living people
New Orleans Saints players
People from Bryson City, North Carolina
Players of American football from North Carolina
Tennessee Volunteers football players
Washington Redskins players
Ed Block Courage Award recipients
People associated with BakerHostetler